Studio Kekkonen is a recording studio in Helsinki, Finland. Owned and operated by Mikko Raita, Janne Riionheimo and Julius Mauranen. Clients Include Ana Johnsson, Apocalyptica, Tuomo,  Deep Insight and Bleak.

External links
Official website

References 

Recording studios in Finland